Hippo's Yawn is a rock near Wave Rock in Western Australia.

The rock's resemblance to a yawning hippopotamus led to its name.

General references

Rock formations of Western Australia
Wheatbelt (Western Australia)
Caves of Western Australia